Gairwah is a village of multiple sub village's (Purwa) [Shahapur, Badakapura, Hatiya, Dadwa, Hannawal, Paschim ka purwa, Rakba, Manpur, Khanpur, Sonwa, etc.] in Jaunpur district of Uttar Pradesh, India.
The Gairwah is in a rural part of Uttar Pradesh, India. The Gairwah extends from north east India Uttar Pradesh at the border of Sultanpur.
According to Census 2011 information the location code or village code of Gairwah village is 200097. Gairwah village is located in Shahganj tehsil of Jaunpur district of Uttar Pradesh, India

Gairwah village overview

 

Villages in Jaunpur district